Jayne Modean is an American model and actress who got her break as a fashion model in the late 1970s, appearing on four Seventeen covers in 1977. She was the featured cover model on the February 1981 Inside Sports annual swimsuit issue.

Career
In 1974, then 16-year-old Modean represented her hometown of Clifton, New Jersey, competing as Miss Teenage Clifton in the Miss Teenage America pageant, where she was selected for a Poise and Appearance award, winning a $500 scholarship.

She appeared in several feature films, including Spring Break (1983) and House II: The Second Story (1987), and a number of TV shows, including Werewolf, Cheers (1987) Full House (1990), Trauma Center (1983), Street Hawk, and The Fall Guy.

Personal life
Modean married comedian Dave Coulier in 1990, and they had a son before divorcing in 1992.

Filmography

Film

Television

References

External links

Living people
American female models
American television actresses
American film actresses
Place of birth missing (living people)
21st-century American women
Year of birth missing (living people)